The idea that a common Judaeo-Christian ethics or Judeo-Christian values underpins American politics, law and morals  has been part of the  "American civil religion" since the 1940s. In recent years, the phrase has been associated with American conservatism, but the concept—though not always the exact phrase—has frequently featured in the rhetoric of leaders across the political spectrum, including that of Franklin D. Roosevelt and Lyndon B. Johnson.

Ethical value system

The current American use of "Judeo-Christian" — to refer to a value system common to Jews and Christians — first appeared in print in a book review by the English writer George Orwell in 1939, with the phrase "the Judaeo-Christian scheme of morals."  Orwell's usage of the term followed at least a decade of efforts by Jewish and Christian leaders, through such groups as the U.S. National Conference of Christians and Jews (founded in 1927), to emphasize common ground. The term continued to gain currency in the 1940s. In part, it was a way of countering antisemitism with the idea that the foundation of morals and law in the United States was a shared one between Jews and Christians.

Franklin D. Roosevelt
The first inaugural address of Franklin D. Roosevelt (FDR), in 1933, the famous speech in which FDR declared that "the only thing we have to fear is fear itself", had numerous religious references, which was widely commented upon at the time.  Although it did not use the term "Judeo-Christian", it has come to be seen by scholars as in tune with the emerging view of a Judeo-Christian tradition.  Historian Mary Stuckey emphasizes "Roosevelt's use of the shared values grounded in the Judeo-Christian tradition" as a way to unify the American nation, and justify his own role as its chief policymaker.

In the speech, FDR attacked the bankers and promised a reform in an echo of the gospels: "The money changers have fled from their high seats in the temple of our civilization. We may now restore that temple to the ancient truths. The measure of the restoration lies in the extent to which we apply social values more noble than mere monetary profit."  Houck and Nocasian, examining the flood of responses to the First Inaugural, and commenting on this passage, argue:
The nation's overwhelmingly Judeo-Christian response to the address thus had both textual and extratextual warrants. For those inclined to see the Divine Hand of Providence at work, Roosevelt's miraculous escape [from assassination] in Miami was a sign—perhaps The Sign—that God had sent another Washington or Lincoln at the appointed hour. ... Many others could not resist the subject position that Roosevelt ... had cultivated throughout the address—that of savior.  After all, it was Christ who had expelled the moneychangers from the Temple. ... [Many listeners saw] a composite sign that their new president had a godly mandate to lead.

Gary Scott Smith stresses that Roosevelt believed his welfare programs were "wholly in accord with the social teachings of Christianity."  He saw the achievement of social justice through government action as morally superior to the old laissez-faire approach.  He proclaimed, "The thing we are seeking is justice," as guided by the precept of "Do unto your neighbor as you would be done by." Roosevelt saw the moral issue as religiosity versus anti-religion.  According to Smith, "He pleaded with Protestants, Catholics, and Jews to transcend their sectarian creeds and 'unite in good works' whenever they could 'find common cause.'"

Atalia Omer and  Jason A. Springs point to Roosevelt's 1939 State of the Union address, which called upon Americans to "defend, not their homes alone, but the tenets of faith and humanity on with which their churches, their governments and their very civilization are founded." They state that, "This familiar rhetoric invoked a conception of the sanctity of the United States' Judeo-Christian values as a basis for war."

Timothy Wyatt notes that in the coming of World War II Roosevelt's isolationist opponents said he was calling for a "holy war."  Wyatt says:
Often in his Fireside Chats or speeches to the houses of Congress, FDR argued for the entrance of America into the war by using both blatant and subtle religious rhetoric. Roosevelt portrayed the conflict in the light of good versus evil, the religious against the irreligious.  In doing so, he pitted the Christian ideals of democracy against the atheism of National Socialism.

Lyndon Johnson
Biographer Randall B. Woods has argued that President Lyndon B. Johnson effectively used appeals to the Judeo-Christian ethical tradition to garner support for the civil rights law of 1965. Woods writes that Johnson undermined the Southern filibuster against the bill:
LBJ wrapped white America in a moral straight jacket. How could individuals who fervently, continuously, and overwhelmingly identified themselves with a merciful and just God continue to condone racial discrimination, police brutality, and segregation? Where in the Judeo-Christian ethic was there justification for killing young girls in a church in Alabama, denying an equal education to black children, barring fathers and mothers from competing for jobs that would feed and clothe their families? Was Jim Crow to be America's response to "Godless Communism"?

Woods went on to assess the role of Judeo-Christian ethics among the nation's political elite:
Johnson's decision to define civil rights as a moral issue, and to wield the nation's self-professed Judeo-Christian ethic as a sword in its behalf, constituted something of a watershed in twentieth-century political history. All presidents were fond of invoking the deity, and some conservatives like Dwight Eisenhower had flirted with employing Judeo-Christian teachings to justify their actions, but modern-day liberals, both politicians and the intellectuals who challenged and nourished them, had shunned spiritual witness. Most liberal intellectuals were secular humanists. Academics in particular had historically been deeply distrustful of organized religion, which they identified with small-mindedness, bigotry, and anti-intellectualism. Like his role model, FDR, Johnson equated liberal values with religious values, insisting freedom and social justice served the ends of both god and man. And he was not loath to say so.

Woods notes that Johnson's religiosity ran deep: "At 15 he joined the Disciples of Christ, or Christian, church and would forever believe that it was the duty of the rich to care for the poor, the strong to assist the weak, and the educated to speak for the inarticulate."

History

1930s and 1940s
Promoting the concept of the United States as a Judeo-Christian nation first became a political program in the 1940s, in response to the growth of anti-Semitism in America. The rise of Nazi anti-semitism in the 1930s led concerned Protestants, Catholics, and Jews to take steps to increase understanding and tolerance.

In this effort, precursors of the National Conference of Christians and Jews created teams consisting of a priest, a rabbi, and a minister, to run programs across the country, and fashion a more pluralistic America, no longer defined as a Christian land, but "one nurtured by three ennobling traditions: Protestantism, Catholicism and Judaism. ... The phrase 'Judeo-Christian' entered the contemporary lexicon as the standard liberal term for the idea that Western values rest on a religious consensus that included Jews."

In the 1930s, "In the face of worldwide antisemitic efforts to stigmatize and destroy Judaism, influential Christians and Jews in America labored to uphold it, pushing Judaism from the margins of American religious life towards its very center." During World War II, Jewish chaplains worked with Catholic priests and Protestant ministers to promote goodwill, addressing servicemen who, "in many cases had never seen, much less heard a Rabbi speak before." At funerals for the unknown soldier, rabbis stood alongside the other chaplains and recited prayers in Hebrew. A 1948 postage stamp commemorated their heroism with the words: "interfaith in action."

1950s, 1960s, and 1970s
In December 1952 President Dwight Eisenhower, speaking extemporaneously a month before his inauguration, said, in what may be the first direct public reference by a U.S. president to the Judeo-Christian concept:
[The Founding Fathers said] 'we hold that all men are endowed by their Creator ... ' In other words, our form of government has no sense unless it is founded in a deeply felt religious faith, and I don't care what it is.  With us of course it is the Judeo-Christian concept, but it must be a religion with all men created equal.

By the 1950s, many conservatives emphasized the Judeo-Christian roots of their values. In 1958, economist Elgin Groseclose claimed that it was ideas "drawn from Judeo-Christian Scriptures that have made possible the economic strength and industrial power of this country."

Senator Barry Goldwater noted that conservatives "believed the communist projection of man as a producing, consuming animal to be used and discarded was antithetical to all the Judeo-Christian  understandings which are the foundations upon which the Republic stands."

Belief in the superiority of Western Judeo-Christian traditions led conservatives to downplay the aspirations of the Third World to free themselves from colonial rule.

The emergence of the "Christian right" as a political force and part of the conservative coalition dates from the 1970s. According to Cambridge University historian Andrew Preston, the emergence of "conservative ecumenism." bringing together Catholics, Mormons, and conservative Protestants into the religious right coalition, was facilitated "by the rise of a Judeo-Christian ethic." These groups "began to mobilize together on cultural-political issues such as abortion and the proposed Equal Rights Amendment for women." As Wilcox and Robinson conclude:
The Christian Right is an attempt to restore Judeo-Christian values to a country that is in deep moral decline. ... [They] believe that society suffers from the lack of a firm basis of Judeo-Christian values and they seek to write laws that embody those values.

1980s and 1990s

By the 1980s and 1990s, favorable references to "Judeo-Christian values" were common, and the term was used by conservative Christians.

President Ronald Reagan frequently emphasized Judeo-Christian values as necessary ingredients in the fight against Communism. He argued that the Bible contains "all the answers to the problems that face us."   Reagan disapproved of the growth of secularism and emphasized the need to take the idea of sin seriously. Tom Freiling, a Christian publisher and head of a conservative PAC, stated in his 2003 book, Reagan's God and Country, that "Reagan's core religious beliefs were always steeped in traditional Judeo-Christian heritage."  Religion—and the Judeo-Christian concept—was a major theme in Reagan's rhetoric by 1980.

President Bill Clinton during his 1992 presidential campaign, likewise emphasized the role of religion in society, and in his personal life, having made references to the Judeo-Christian tradition.

The term became especially significant in American politics, and, promoting "Judeo-Christian values" in the culture wars, usage surged in the 1990s.

James Dobson, a prominent evangelical Christian, said the Judeo-Christian tradition includes the right to display numerous historical documents in Kentucky schools, after they were banned by a federal judge in May 2000 because they were "conveying a very specific governmental endorsement of religion".

Since 9/11
According to Hartmann et al., usage shifted between 2001 and 2005, with the mainstream media using the term less, in order to characterize America as multicultural.  The study finds the term is now most likely to be used by liberals in connection with discussions of Muslim and Islamic inclusion in America, and renewed debate about the separation of church and state.

In 2012, the book Kosher Jesus by Orthodox rabbi Shmuley Boteach was published. In it, Boteach concludes by writing, as to Judeo-Christian values, that "the hyphen between Jewish and Christian values is Jesus himself."

In U.S. law
In the case of Marsh v. Chambers, 463 U.S. 783 (1983), the Supreme Court of the United States held that a state legislature could constitutionally have a paid chaplain to conduct legislative prayers "in the Judeo-Christian tradition." In Simpson v. Chesterfield County Board of Supervisors, the Fourth Circuit Court of Appeals held that the Supreme Court's holding in the Marsh case meant that the "Chesterfield County could constitutionally exclude Cynthia Simpson, a Wiccan priestess, from leading its legislative prayers, because her faith was not 'in the Judeo-Christian tradition.'" Chesterfield County's board included Jewish, Christian, and Muslim clergy in its invited list.

Several legal disputes, especially in Alabama, have challenged the public display of the Ten Commandments. See:
 Glassroth v. Moore for Alabama
 Green v. Haskell County Board of Commissioners, for Oklahoma
 McCreary County v. American Civil Liberties Union, for Kentucky
 Pleasant Grove City v. Summum, for Utah
 Stone v. Graham for Kentucky
 Van Orden v. Perry for Texas

Criticism and responses

Some theologians warn against the uncritical use of "Judeo-Christian" entirely, arguing that it can license mischief, such as opposition to secular humanism with scant regard to modern Jewish, Catholic, or Christian traditions, including the liberal strains of different faiths, such as Reform Judaism and liberal Protestant Christianity.

Two notable books addressed the relations between contemporary Judaism and Christianity. Abba Hillel Silver's Where Judaism Differs and Leo Baeck's Judaism and Christianity were both motivated by an impulse to clarify Judaism's distinctiveness "in a world where the term Judeo-Christian had obscured critical differences between the two faiths."

Reacting against the blurring of theological distinctions, Rabbi Eliezer Berkovits wrote that "Judaism is Judaism because it rejects Christianity, and Christianity is Christianity because it rejects Judaism."

Theologian and author Arthur A. Cohen, in The Myth of the Judeo-Christian Tradition, questioned the theological validity of the Judeo-Christian concept and suggested that it was essentially an invention of American politics, while Jacob Neusner, in Jews and Christians: The Myth of a Common Tradition, writes, "The two faiths stand for different people talking about different things to different people."

Law professor Stephen M. Feldman, looking at the period before 1950, chiefly in Europe, sees the concept of a Judeo-Christian tradition as supersessionism, which he characterizes as "dangerous Christian dogma (at least from a Jewish perspective)", and as a "myth" which "insidiously obscures the real and significant differences between Judaism and Christianity."

Abrahamic religion
Advocates of the term "Abrahamic religion" since the second half of the 20th century have proposed an inclusivism that widens the "Judeo-Christian" concept to include Islam as well. The rationale for the term "Abrahamic" is that Islam, like Judaism and Christianity, traces its origins to the figure of Abraham, whom Islam regards as a prophet. Advocates of this umbrella term consider it the "exploration of something positive" in the sense of a "spiritual bond" between Jews, Christians, and Muslims.

Australia

Australian historian Tony Taylor points out that Australia has borrowed the "Judeo-Christian" theme from American conservative discourse.

Jim Berryman, another Australian historian, argues that from the 1890s to the present, rhetoric upholding Australia's traditional attachment to Western civilisation emphasizes three themes: the core British heritage; Australia's Judeo-Christian belief system; and the rational principles of the Enlightenment.   These themes have been expressed mostly on the Australian center-right political spectrum, and most prominently among conservative-leaning commentators.

See also
 American civil religion
 Abraham Accords
Abrahamic religions

References

Further reading
 Coe, Kevin, and Sarah Chenoweth. "The Evolution of Christian America: Christianity in Presidential Discourse, 1981–2013." International Journal of Communication 9:753-73 (2015) online
 Cohen, Arthur A. The Myth of the Judeo-Christian Tradition. Harper & Row, New York, 1970.
 Gelernter, David. Americanism: The Fourth Great Western Religion. Doubleday. 2007; 
 Hartmann, Douglas, Xuefeng Zhang, and William Wischstadt. "One (Multicultural) Nation Under God? Changing Uses and Meanings of the Term 'Judeo-Christian' in the American Media." Journal of Media and Religion 4.4 (2005): 207–234.
 Lillback, Peter A.George Washington's Sacred Fire. (Providence Forum Press,2006. )
 Merino, Stephen M. "Religious diversity in a "Christian nation": The effects of theological exclusivity and interreligious contact on the acceptance of religious diversity." Journal for the Scientific Study of Religion 49.2 (2010): 231-246.
 Moore, Deborah Dash. "Jewish GIs and the Creation of the Judeo-Christian Tradition," Religion and American Culture: A Journal of Interpretation, Vol. 8, No. 1 (Winter, 1998), pp. 31–53 in JSTOR
 Novak, Michael. On Two Wings: Humble Faith and Common Sense at the American Founding. Encounter Books, 2002. 
 Preston, Andrew. "A Judeo-Christian Foreign Policy," in Preston, Sword of the Spirit, Shield of Faith: Religion in American War and Diplomacy (2012) pp 559–74.
 Schultz, Kevin M. Tri-Faith America: How Catholics and Jews held postwar America to its Protestant promise (Oxford University Press, 2011).
 Shaban, Fuad. For Zion's sake: the Judeo-Christian tradition in American culture (Pluto Press, 2005). online
 Silk, Mark. "Notes on the Judeo-Christian tradition in America," American Quarterly,'' (1984) 36:65–85, the standard history of the term in JSTOR
 Wall, Wendy L. Inventing the "American Way": The politics of consensus from the New Deal to the Civil rights movement". Oxford University Press, 2008. 

American culture
Judeo-Christian topics